Zeta Cygni (ζ Cyg) is a binary star system in the northern constellation of Cygnus, the swan.

The primary component, ζ Cyg A is a giant star with a spectral type of G8 IIIp. Its most likely status is as a red clump giant, an evolved star that has begun core helium fusion. It has around three times the mass of the Sun and has expanded to about 15 times the Sun's radius. It is radiating 112 times the brightness of the Sun from its outer atmosphere at an effective temperature of 4,910 K. At this temperature, the star glows with the yellow hue of a G-type star.

The secondary component, ζ Cyg B, is a white dwarf of type DA4.2. The pair orbit each other every 6,489 days (17.8 years) with an eccentricity of 0.22. The white dwarf cannot be seen directly, but is estimated to have an apparent magnitude of 13.2.

Zeta Cygni has an overabundance of barium, as well as other heavy chemical elements in its atmosphere, making it a so-called "mild" barium star. These elements were synthesized by the other member of the system as it passed through the asymptotic giant branch (AGB) stage of its evolution, then ejected in its stellar wind and accreted onto the current primary component. Prior to acquiring this additional mass, Zeta Cygni had about 2.5 times the mass of the Sun, while the more evolved AGB star had three solar masses.

References

External links 
 

G-type giants
White dwarfs
Barium stars
Horizontal-branch stars
Spectroscopic binaries
Cygnus (constellation)
Cygni, Zeta
BD+29 4348
Cygni, 64
202109
104732
8115